Tinnahinch is a barony in County Laois (formerly called Queen's County or County Leix), in the Republic of Ireland.

History

The southern part of Tinnahinch was called Gailine, and it is mentioned in the topographical poem Tuilleadh feasa ar Éirinn óigh (Giolla na Naomh Ó hUidhrín, d. 1420):

List of settlements

Settlements in Tinnahinch barony:
Clonaslee
Mountmellick
Rosenallis
Florin

References

Baronies of County Laois